Natalia Mendez (born January 28, 1997) is a Bolivian-born Argentine racquetball player. She is the current Pan American Champion in Women's Doubles and South American Champion in Women's Doubles, winning both titles with Maria Jose Vargas. Mendez has medaled at the International Racquetball Federation (IRF) World Championships as well as the Pan American Games.

2007-2015 - Junior years & Playing for Bolivia 

Mendez competed at the International Racquetball Federation (IRF) Junior World Championships in 2007 in Cochabamba, Bolivia, where she won Girl’s U10, beating Mexican Karla Gascon, 15-4, 15-1, in the final. But she lost in the Girl’s U12 final at World Juniors in 2009 in Santo Domingo, Dominican Republic, to Mexican Diana Aguilar, 15-7, 15-13. However, in 2009, Mendez played Girls U14 Doubles with Masiel Rivera, and they were runners-up to the USA’s Kelani Bailey and Abbey Lavely, losing the final, 15-7, 15-10.

Mendez and Augilar also met in the Girl’s U12 final at World Juniors in 2010 in Los Angeles with the same result: a win for Aguilar, 15-5, 15-9. But she also play U14 Girls Singles in Los Angeles and she won, defeating Mexican Ximena Gonzalez in the final, 8-15, 15-12, 11-9.

Mendez reached the Girls U14 Singles final at the 2011 World Juniors in Santo Domingo, Dominican Republic, where she lost to Diana Aguilar of Mexico, 11-15, 15-10, 11-5, once again. She also played Girls U16 Singles, and lost to Venezuela’s Mariana Tobon in the Round of 16, 15-13, 13-15, 11-1.

The 2012 Girls U14 Singles final at Los Angeles was a rematch of 2011, and Aguilar again defeated Mendez, 14-15, 15-13, 11-3. But Mendez found success in the Girls U16 Singles that year, as she won that division by defeating Ximenez Gonzalez of Mexico in the final, 15-11, 15-12.

Mendez and Diana Aguilar of Mexico met once again in a final at World Juniors in 2013. This time it was Girls U16 Singles in Sucre, Bolivia, where Aguilar again got the best of Mendez, winning 15-13, 7-15, 11-2. Mendez was 2nd in Girls U16 Doubles also that year, playing with Iriana Avendaño.

Mendez played at the Pan American Championships for the first time in 2014 in Santa Cruz, Bolivia, representing her native land at home. In Santa Cruz, she played Women’s Singles, and lost to Canadian Frédérique Lambert, 15-8, 12-15, 11-1, in the Round of 16.

Mendez made her 1st appearance at the IRF World Championships at age 17, when she represented Bolivia at the 2014 World Championships in Burlington, Ontario. In Women’s Singles, Mendez lost in the Round of 32 to Sofia Soley of Costa Rica, 15-13, 15-13. But in Women’s Doubles with Adriana Riveros, they beat Soley and Melania Sauma (Costa Rica), 15-10, 15-7, in the Round of 16, but lost to two time defending champions Paola Longoria and Samantha Salas of Mexico, 15-5, 15-12, in the quarterfinals.

At the 2014 World Junior Championships in Cali, Colombia, Mendez lost in the quarterfinals of Girls U16 Singles to team-mate Hawira Rojas, 9-15, 15-7, 11-8. But Mendez did reach the semi-finals of Girls U18 Singles, losing to Mexico’s Alexandra Herrera, 15-6, 15-3.

Mendez won Girls U18 Singles in 2015 in Santo Domingo, Dominican Republic, where she defeated Dominican Maria Cespedes in the final, 15-9, 15-3. She played doubles with Wanda Carvajal that year, and they lost in the semi-finals to Costa Ricans Melania Sauma and Sofia Soley, 15-8, 7-15, 11-3.

Mendez attended her first Pan American Games in Toronto in 2015, when she played in Women’s Doubles and in the Women's Team event. In doubles, Mendez and Carola Loma defeated Gabriela Martinez and Maria Renee Rodriguez of Guatemala in the Round of 16, 10-15, 15-11, 11-5, but then lost to Mexicans Paola Longoria and Samantha Salas, 15-9, 15-0, in the quarterfinals. In the Women’s Team event Bolivia lost to Ecuador, 2-0, in the quarterfinals.

She began to play the Ladies Professional Racquetball Tour (LPRT) in 2016, and competed in 8 of the 12 events the 2016-17 season. She reached the quarterfinals three times, and finished the season ranked 12th.

2017 to present - Playing for Argentina and on the LPRT 

When Mendez played at the Pan American Championships for a second time, she was representing Argentina in San José, Costa Rica in 2017. In Women’s Singles, she lost in the Round of 16 to Guatemalan Gabriela Martinez, 15-4, 15-2. In doubles, Mendez and Véronique Guillemette lost in the quarterfinals to Gabriela Martinez and Andrea Martinez (Guatemala), 15-6, 15-9.

Mendez got the semi-finals of the US Open Racquetball Championships in 2017, and was just a few points from the final, as she lost to Frédérique Lambert, 11-8, 2-11, 11-2, 7-11, 11-8. She also reached the semis at the Battle of the Alamo LPRT tournament in April 2018. These results helped her finish 7th at the end of the 2017-18 LPRT season.

Mendez played at the 2018 Pan American Championships in Temuco, Chile in March 2018. In Women’s Singles, she lost to the Gabriela Martinez in a tie-breaker, 15-12, 10-15, 11-2, in the quarterfinals. In Women's Doubles,  Mendez partnered with Maria Jose Vargas, and they lost to Mexicans Paola Longoria and Alexandra Herrera, 15-14, 15-6., in the quarterfinals.

Mendez was a double gold medalist at the 2018 South American Games in Cochabamba, Bolivia. In Women’s Doubles, Mendez and Maria Jose Vargas beat Bolivians Stefanny Barrios and Jenny Daza, in the doubles final, 15-11, 15-10. They also defeated Bolivia in the Women's Team competition. In Women’s Singles, she lost to Colombian Cristina Amaya, 15-4, 15-4, in the quarterfinals.

At the 2018 World Championships in San José, Costa Rica, Mendez played both singles and doubles, as she represented Argentina for the first time. In Women's Singles, she beat Canadian Frédérique Lambert, 15-8, 15-8, in the Round of 16, and the USA’s Rhonda Rajsich, 15-1, 15-13. Mendez lost the semi-final to Guatemalan Gabriela Martinez, 15-8, 15-3. She played Women's Doubles with Maria Jose Vargas, and they lost in the quarterfinals to Guatemalans Gabriela Martinez and Maria Renee Rodriguez, 15-2, 15-8. So, she came away from San José with her first World Championship medal: bronze in Women’s Singles.

At the 2019 Pan American Championships in Barranquilla, Colombia, Mendez reached the semi-finals in Women’s Singles, as she beat Mexico’s Montserrat Mejia in the quarterfinals, 15-13, 15-13. But in the semis, she lost to her Argentina team-mate Maria Jose Vargas, 15-9, 14-15, 11-7. In Women’s Doubles, Mendez and Vargas beat Chileans Carla Muñoz and Josefa Parada, 15-7, 15-8, in the Round of 16, but they lost in the quarterfinals to Longoria and Samantha Salas of Mexico, 15-7, 15-6.

In the 2018-19 LPRT season, Mendez didn’t reach a semi-final, but she played all 10 events and was in eight quarterfinals. Mendez ended the season ranked 6th.

Mendez played at the 2019 Pan American Games in Lima, Peru, which was her 2nd Pan Am Games, but first for Argentina. She got to the semi-finals in Women’s Singles. Mendez beat Guatemala’s Gabriela Martinez, 15-10, 12-15, 11-6, in the Round of 16, and Ecuador’s Maria Paz Muñoz in the quarterfinals, 15-5, 10-15, 11-7. In the semi-finals, Mendez lost to Mexican Paola Longoria, 15-10, 15-10. In Women’s Doubles, she and Maria Jose Vargas beat Canadians Frédérique Lambert and Jennifer Saunders, 15-9, 15-9, in the quarterfinals, but lost to Guatemalans Martinez and Maria Renee Rodriguez in the semi-finals, 15-9, 10-15, 11-1. Then in the Women’s Team event, Mendez and Vargas were runners-up to Mexico. Thus, Mendez took home three medals - one silver and two bronze - from Lima.

So far in the 2018-19 LPRT season Mendez has been in one semi-final - the 3rd of his career - and three quarterfinals out of five events.

Mendez won two gold medals at the 2022 Pan American Racquetball Championships. She won gold in Women's Doubles with Maria Jose Vargas, defeating Mexicans Alexandra Herrera and Samantha Salas in the final, 15-14, 14-15, 15-10, 8-15, 11-9. She also helped Argentina to gold in the Women's Team event, when they defeated Canada in the quarterfinals, the USA in the semi-finals, and Mexico in the final. Mendez also played in Women's Singles, but lost in the quarterfinals to Gabriela Martinez of Guatemala, 12-15, 14-15, 15-11, 15-13, 11-8. 

Mendez medalled twice at the 2022 World Championships. In singles, she lost to Mexican Alexandra Herrera in the quarterfinals, 11-8, 11-3, 11-8. In the Women's Doubles final, she and Valeria Centellas lost to Mexicans Paola Longoria and Samantha Salas in five games, 11-6, 15-17, 11-9, 9-11, 12-10, resulting in a silver medal. In the Women's Team event, Mendez earned a bronze medal, as Argentina reached the semi-finals, but then lost to Bolivia.

Career summary

Mendez played three times for her native Bolivia, and has played several times for Argentina, winning several medals, highlighted by gold in Women’s Doubles at the South American Games. In five seasons on the Ladies Professional Racquetball Tour, Mendez has been in the top 10 four times.

Career record

This table lists Mendez’s results across annual events.

See also
 List of racquetball players

References 

1997 births
Living people
Racquetball players at the 2019 Pan American Games
Racquetball players at the 2015 Pan American Games
Pan American Games medalists in racquetball
Argentine racquetball players
South American Games medalists in racquetball
Competitors at the 2018 South American Games
South American Games gold medalists for Argentina
Pan American Games silver medalists for Argentina
Pan American Games bronze medalists for Argentina
Bolivian racquetball players
Medalists at the 2019 Pan American Games
Competitors at the 2022 World Games